"Glory" is a KMFDM single from the album Angst. It contains three remixes of the title track "Glory" (as well as the version from Angst), plus remixes of the tracks "Lust" (by Chemlab) and "Move On", both originally from Angst. There is also a rough mix of "Trust," which was released in its final version on the album Nihil.

Track listing

1994 release

2009 7" Reissue track listing

2014 12" release

B-side
The song "A Hole in the Wall" was remixed (as "Hole in the Wall") for this single, but was not released until it appeared on the compilation album Agogo.

References

1994 singles
KMFDM songs
TVT Records singles
1994 songs
Wax Trax! Records singles
Songs written by Sascha Konietzko
Songs written by Günter Schulz
Songs written by Chris Shepard